The Nanticoke River is a tributary of the Chesapeake Bay on the Delmarva Peninsula. It rises in southern Kent County, Delaware, flows through Sussex County, Delaware, and forms the boundary between Dorchester County, Maryland and Wicomico County, Maryland. The tidal river course proceeds southwest into the Tangier Sound, Chesapeake Bay. A 26-mile ecotourism water trail running along the River was set aside in July 2011 by Delaware state and federal officials, contiguous with a 37-mile water-trail extending through Maryland to the Chesapeake Bay.

Some of the main tributaries that feed the Nanticoke on the west-side include: Cow Creek; Jack Creek; Wapremander Creek; Marshyhope Creek; and the east side: Gravelly Fork, Gum Branch, and Broad Creek.  Notable towns and communities situated along the river include Nanticoke, Bivalve, Vienna, and Sharptown in Maryland; and further north the city of Seaford, Delaware.

According to a study paid for by the town of Vienna, the English explorer John Smith travelled up the Nanticoke River and mapped it, and visited with Native Americans in their settlement, now believed to be Vienna.

The river was dredged in 1990 and 2013 to facilitate shipping travel along the course.

See also
List of rivers of Delaware
List of rivers of Maryland

Notes

References

Tributaries of the Chesapeake Bay
Rivers of Delaware
Rivers of Maryland
Rivers of Caroline County, Maryland
Rivers of Kent County, Delaware
Rivers of Sussex County, Delaware
Water trails